A Technosol in the World Reference Base for Soil Resources is a Reference Soil Group that combines soils whose properties and pedogenesis are dominated by their technical origin. They contain either a significant amount of artefacts (something in the soil recognizably made or extracted from the earth by humans), some sort of geotechnical liner, or are sealed by technic hard rock (hard material created by humans, having properties unlike natural rock). They include soils from wastes (landfills, sludge, cinders, mine spoils and ashes), pavements with their underlying unconsolidated materials, soils with geomembranes and constructed soils in human-made materials. However, Technosols can also refer to a situation in which normal soil, such as a Chernozem, has been moved to a new location to act as a fill.  If this fill is less than 50 cm, then the soil is called a Technosol.  If fill material is greater than 50 cm deep, then the fill is designated by the original soil used to create the fill, in our example, a Chernozem.  Technosols are often referred to as urban or mine soils. They are recognized in the new Russian soil classification system as Technogenic Superficial Formations.

Technosols are developed on all kinds of materials made or exposed by human activity that otherwise would not occur at the Earth’s surface. They occur mostly in urban and industrial areas, usually in small areas, and can be associated with other soil groups in a complex pattern.  They are closely related to Anthrosols, which are soils created by the long term addition of organic matter to a soil, such as an old urban garden.
Most of the research on anthropogenic soils describe specific aspects of their biology, chemistry or physical properties, cultural heritage and human geography, erosion, wastes, pollution, fertilizer management, taxonomy. Very few of them, try to answer to the question: How fast do they start pedogenesis (viz., differentiating horizons)? A Technosol could differentiate A and O horizons at rates of more than one centimeter per year.
Technosols are found throughout the world, e.g. at or near cities, roads, mines, refuse dumps, oil spills and coal fly ash deposits.

These soils are more likely to be contaminated than other soils. Many Technosols have to be treated with care as they may contain toxic substances resulting from industrial processes.

See also 
Anthrosol
Constructed soil
Pedogenesis
Pedology (soil study)
Soil classification

References
 IUSS Working Group WRB: World Reference Base for Soil Resources, fourth edition. International Union of Soil Sciences, Vienna 2022. .

Further reading
 W. Zech, P. Schad, G. Hintermaier-Erhard: Soils of the World. Springer, Berlin 2022, Chapter 12.3.3. 
 P. Schad: Technosols in the World Reference Base for Soil Resources – history and definitions. Journal of Soil Science and Plant Nutrition 64(2), 138–144, Tokyo 2018.

External links 
 profile photos (with classification) WRB homepage
 profile photos (with classification) IUSS World of Soils

Pedology
Types of soil